Archie J. Old Jr. (August 1, 1906 – March 24, 1984) was a lieutenant general in the United States Air Force.

Early life
Old was born in Farmersville, Texas, on August 1, 1906.

Military career

Old flew 43 combat missions against Germany. On October 14, 1943, Old led the second raid on the Schweinfurt ball-bearing factories in the Fertile Myrtle III. Of 291 B-17s that reached the target, 60 were downed by flak or enemy fighters, for a loss rate of 20 percent. On June 21, 1944, Old led the second shuttle bombing run to Russia. The B-17 that Col. Old was in for the first Schweinfurt mission aborted, so Col. Curtis Lemay and BGen. Robert Williams led the first Schweinfurt raid on 17 August; Col. Old and Col. Budd Peaslee led the second Schweinfurt raid on 14 October 1944.  On June 21, 1944, Col. Old led the second Shuttle Mission to Russia.

In July 1948 he was named commander of the Atlantic Division of the Military Air Transport Service.

In 1951 Old got two of SAC's important overseas jobs of commanding the 7th Air Division in England and the 5th Air Division in French Morocco. Old retired September 1, 1965. He died March 24, 1984, at the base hospital at March Air Force Base.

Commands held

Other achievements

Military awards
    Distinguished Service Cross
    Air Force Distinguished Service Medal
    Silver Star with oak leaf cluster
   Legion of Merit
   Distinguished Flying Cross with four oak leaf clusters
   Purple Heart
    Air Medal with eight oak leaf clusters

Foreign decorations
French Legion of Honor
Belgian Croix de guerre with Palm
Russian Order of Suvorov
French Croix de Guerre with Palm
British Distinguished Flying Cross
French Moroccan Order of Ouissam Alaouite

Television appearance
Old appeared, playing himself, in "Massacre", a 1966 episode of the television show Twelve O'Clock High.

References
 Anzovin, Steven, Famous First Facts, H. W. Wilson Company, New York 2000,

Notes

United States Air Force generals
Recipients of the Air Force Distinguished Service Medal
Recipients of the Legion of Merit
United States Army Air Forces personnel of World War II
People from Farmersville, Texas
United States Army Air Forces officers
1906 births
1984 deaths
Recipients of the Silver Star
Recipients of the Distinguished Service Cross (United States)
Recipients of the Distinguished Flying Cross (United States)
Military personnel from Texas